Randy Scott (1946-2015) was a Republican member of the South Carolina Senate, representing the 38th District from 2004 to 2008. He died in December 2015.

External links
South Carolina Legislature - Senator Randy Scott official SC Senate website
Project Vote Smart - Senator Randy Scott (SC) profile
Follow the Money - Randy Scott
2006 2004 2002 2000 1996 campaign contributions

References

South Carolina state senators
1946 births
2015 deaths